This was the first season of the new Russian Professional Rugby League, replacing the former Super League.

External links
Official website 
Information rugby portal 
Russian rugby statistics 

2005
2005 in Russian rugby union
2005 rugby union tournaments for clubs
2005–06 in European rugby union leagues
2004–05 in European rugby union leagues